Elvis is a 2022 biographical drama film directed by Baz Luhrmann from a screenplay he co-wrote with Sam Bromell, Craig Pearce, and Jeremy Doner. It chronicles the life of the American rock and roll singer and actor Elvis Presley under the management of Colonel Tom Parker. The film stars Austin Butler and Tom Hanks as Presley and Parker, respectively, with Olivia DeJonge, Helen Thomson, Richard Roxburgh, David Wenham, Kodi Smit-McPhee, and Luke Bracey in supporting roles.

The film has received various awards and nominations. Elvis garnered three Golden Globe nominations at the 80th ceremony, winning for Best Actor. It received eight nominations at the 95th Academy Awards, including Best Picture, Best Actor, Best Sound, Best Production Design, Best Cinematography, Best Makeup and Hairstyling, Best Costume Design, and Best Film Editing. Elvis was named one of the ten best films of 2022 by the American Film Institute.

Accolades

Notes

References

External links
 

Lists of accolades by film
Warner Bros. Discovery-related lists